The Worker's Friend Group was a Jewish anarchist group active in London's East End in the early 1900s. Associated with the Yiddish-language anarchist newspaper Arbeter Fraint ("Worker's Friend") and centered around the German emigre anarchist Rudolf Rocker, the group ran a social center known as the Worker's Friend Club and Institute and Jubilee Street Club from 1906 to 1915. The club became a fixture in London's Jewish social community and was influential on the area's artists and writers. Its cultural programming included concerts, performances, and lectures on political, scientific, and literary topics. The newspaper, begun as a Jewish socialist periodical, grew towards anarchism with the arrival of Saul Yanovsky. It was the most popular radical Yiddish-language newspaper in London by 1904 and reached a peak circulation at 5,000 weekly copies the next year. The Arbeter Fraint ran from 1885 to 1915. The group's operations declined following the British entry into World War I, as rising anti-German sentiment and Rocker's anti-war beliefs culminated in his detention, never to return to the town.

Group 

The Workers' Friend Group, or the Arbeter Frainters, consisted of two or three dozen members from the early 1900s through 1914. The group was small and elitist in the face of a predominantly religious immigrant culture. As a group of close-knit friends, who lived in close proximity as a "quasi-Libertarian commune", they regularly raised funds for their club. The editorial group would meet in a member's handbag workshop as an editorial group, discuss the newspaper's next issue, and pool funds, often a significant part of their wages.

The group would fundraise through socials and balls, which brought together both those politically aligned and not. Their two or three masked balls would raise up to 30 in an evening, with vocal performances and a lecture from Rudolf Rocker. Some workshops nailed a cigar box to their walls to collect pennies for the paper. Other sweatshop workers contributed pennies from their meager incomes. Proceeds from literature and personal subsidies also funded the group.

Those associated with the group lived in unspoken agreement that all ages and sexes were to be treated as free equals, without patronization. The group's main opponents were the Freiheit group from London's West End, who had previously broke with Rocker ideologically.

Club 

Confrontations in the community reinforced the group's need for a permanent clubhouse. Having saved enough, per treasurer Lazar Sabelinsky, the group began to rent a two-storey building in 1906 at 165 Jubilee Street, a former Methodist church and Salvation Army depot that was often rented for social events. The building's owner liked the group's restrained mode of operating and Rocker's transparency. Sabelinsky, Prusky, Freeman, and Schatz together leased the building but its operations were self-managed. After several weeks of preparations and interior design from anarchists and non-anarchist artisans alike, the group built a stage and bar in the great hall. Contributors donated tables and chairs in the lower hall, which could fit 800. Workers built shelves in the second storey, which became a library. The adjacent 163 Jubilee Street became the Arbeter Fraint headquarters.

The Worker's Friend Club and Institute, also known as the Jubilee Street Club, opened on February 3, 1906. Opening festivities filled the building to its capacity despite the opening being on a Sabbath Saturday. Rocker inaugurated the opening with a speech on events predating the group's purchase of the lease and the drive of federated Yiddish-speaking anarchists. Rocker read statements in support from Jewish labor unions, Errico Malatesta, and Fernando Tarrida del Mármol, but was cut short when Peter Kropotkin appeared at the event to applause. Kropotkin, who had been ill, congratulated the crowd and spoke about their cause. John Turner compared the club to its Berner Street Club predecessor, and called the Jubilee Street Club more sophisticated. The Cockney carman Ted Leggatt also spoke before the festivities turned to a recital and then a band.

The club became a Jewish social community fixture through 1914, as a place for recreation, refreshment, and debate. Historian William J. Fishman likened the club's activity, which welcomed all across age, political, and intellectual divides, to that of Toynbee Hall. Its library, reading room, and classes were open to the community. This restricted the club from the lucrative practice of selling alcohol, based on laws that limited service to membership. Members maintained its bar, which served coffee, tea, and food. Both men and women volunteered to serve and clean, though cooking fell mainly to the women. Volunteers recalled seeing both famous figures at the club and serving Jewish orthodox the night of Kol Nidre, usually a time for fasting.

Cultural programming at the club included concerts, lectures, and performances. The stage hosted early performances by future Yiddish theatre figures Samuel Goldenberg and Abraham Teitelbaum. Theatrical performances included that of Leonid Andreyev and Sholem Aleichem. The stage featured classes and lectures from Rocker, Malatesta, Kropotkin, and Varlam Cherkezov on political, scientific, and literary topics. Public discussions, such as on the existence of God, invited all attendees to participate. On Sundays, the club hosted tea and sandwiches with a lecture. In the summers, the group would make a trip to Epping Forest, schlepping tables, drinks, and food from the club by horse and cart. The group explored the forest and Rocker would lecture.

Socials, dances, concerts, and the newspaper no longer sufficed to meet operating costs. The group rented the space, mainly to radical groups, for occasional functions. Small labor unions and branches of the Workers' circle and Russian Social Revolutionaries used the building for recurring meetings.

The group ultimately functioned as more of a social center than a revolutionary hotbed. The group's only public agitation was strike actions. The club's open nature made it susceptible to revolutionary emigres, who kept their same anti-bourgeois fervor in Britain. Considering agent provocateurs and double agents like the Azef affair, the club became wary of political emigrees. Rocker, a voice of moderation, held that terrorism was a setback for the movement, and the group did worry that propaganda of the deed in London would endanger their club. Indeed, the only occasion that threatened the club's closure was the events surrounding the Siege of Sidney Street. The police monitored the club but took no major action.

Newspaper 

The rise of pogroms against Jews in Russia in the early 1880s set off an exodus. The two million emigres created Yiddish newspapers, cultural organizations, and unions where they landed. In Great Britain, the Jewish population more than quadrupled between the 1880s and 1919. The Russian emigres tended to live in poorer areas, such as London's East End. One of these emigres, the Jewish socialist Morris Winchevsky created Arbeter Fraint in July 1885 as a Jewish socialist monthly, though the paper allowed anarchists and other radicals to contribute. The Jewish Workers' Educational Club took over editorial responsibilities in June 1886, whereupon the periodical became a weekly magazine that reached beyond London. The Haymarket affair attracted anarchist sympathies among Jewish immigrants in London. The Arbeter Fraint developed an international tone, printing letters from Jewish writers around the world.

In October 1898, Rudolf Rocker became an editor of the Arbeter Fraint. Saul Yanovsky, recruited to come to London, became an editor in 1891 and brought anarchist influence with him. The paper published articles by Yanovsky and other leading anarchists, as well as anarchist pamphlets (in Yiddish). By 1892, the periodical had the subtitle, "Anarchist-Communist Organ".

By 1904, the Arbeter Fraint was "the most popular radical newspaper in Yiddish" in London. It reached peak circulation at 5,000 weekly copies in early 1905 as the area's main radical Yiddish paper. The newspaper's noteworthy collaborators included Abraham Frumkin.

Britain's declaration of war against Germany in August 1914 ended the anarchist movement in London's East End. The anarchists held opposing positions on the war. Arbeter Fraint reduced in size as its readership declined. Its October and November columns contained arguments for and against the war. Rocker had a four-part column in opposition, which was dangerous to print. In early December 1914, Rocker was arrested at home and would be interned for four years before being expelled. In 1915, the police closed the Arbeter Fraint press and offices. The club faded. The building was used as a cinema and then as a synagogue.

Legacy 

Yiddish scholar Joseph Leftwich later wrote of the Workers' Friend Club's great influence on artists and writers in London's East End.

Some members of the Workers' Friend group moved to New York and participated in radical Yiddish culture there, including the Fraye Arbeter Shtime. Members of the Workers' Friend group helped to found in 1903 the English branch of the socialism-focused Jewish Workers' Circle, a mutual aid organization based in the United States. The English branch expanded to its peak membership in the interwar period.

References

Bibliography

Further reading 

 
 

Anarchism in England
Jewish anarchism
Organizations established in the 1900s
Jewish organisations based in the United Kingdom
Judaism in London